Laurent Rodriguez (born 25 June 1960) is a retired French rugby player.

He made his international debut for France on 5 July 1981 in a test against Australia. Rodriguez was called for the 1987 Rugby World Cup, where France was runners-up to New Zealand.

External links

 

1960 births
Living people
French rugby union players
French rugby union coaches
France international rugby union players
Sportspeople from Poitiers
ASM Clermont Auvergne players
Rugby union number eights
Stade Montois players
US Dax players